Faiza Ashraf was a 26-year-old Pakistani-Norwegian woman who was kidnapped early in the morning on 3 February 2010 from a bus-stop at Haslum in Bærum, outside of Oslo, while on her way to work. She was later found murdered near the parking lot in Solli, in the neighboring municipality of Asker. 

After receiving a call from Ashraf alerting them to her kidnap, the police arrested Shamrez Khan, and later Håvard Nyfløt, who admitted to kidnapping Ashraf on the orders of Khan. Both men were convicted and sentenced to prison. Known as the "Faiza-case", the case generated a considerable amount of media attention in Norway at the time. It was one of the first incidents of non-gang-related contract killings in modern Norwegian history.

Kidnapping
In the early morning of Wednesday 3 February 2010, 26-year-old Faiza Ashraf was waiting for the bus leaving her home in Haslum and heading to downtown Oslo, where she worked in a clothing boutique. While she was standing at the bus stop at approximately 06:40, 25-year-old Håvard Nyfløt pulled up, grabbed her and forced her into the trunk of his car. Ashraf managed to call the police from her cell-phone and inform them that she was being kidnapped, but she could not give her exact location. This event was witnessed by at least one passing motorist.

After a short while, Nyfløt stopped the car and informed her that he was being paid by a third person to kidnap her, and that he was to be paid NOK 100,000 for the crime. He also promised not to harm her, before continuing the drive. Ashraf then passed that information, along with a short description of her kidnapper, to the police, who were trying to trace the call. She also provided the police with the identity of Khan, whom she deduced had ordered her kidnapping. Khan had for the past five years been obsessed with marrying her, and according to Ashraf, harassed and tormented her during this period.

After driving to the forested area of Solli in Asker, about 25 minutes outside of Oslo, Nyfløt opened his trunk and found Ashraf unresponsive. He then dragged her body to a pre-prepared shallow grave about 200 meters from a popular ski-trail. Afterwards he vacuumed the trunk and used a makeshift blowtorch to eliminate leftover evidence, before travelling to Sweden with his girlfriend.

Investigation
On Wednesday 3 February Police announced a woman in her 20s from Asker had vanished. Police stated that they believed she had been kidnapped. All traffic coming through Asker was stopped and checked by heavily armed police, That afternoon, Police arrested 28-year-old taxi-driver Shamrez Khan in Oslo. Ashraf had named him as possible accomplice in her kidnapping in her brief call to the police. Khan had a long history of harassment and stalking Ashraf, and according to friends she felt threatened by him. He initially denied all culpability, and stated his desire to participate in finding her.

Large numbers of police and volunteer forces canvassed the Vestmarka woodlands adjacent to where her cell-phone was last used, but could not locate the missing 26-year old. Police also issued a yellow notice, in case she had been abducted and taken abroad.

On Wednesday 10 February, police arrested 25-year old Nyfløt, on suspicion of carrying out the kidnapping. He later revealed under interrogation that Ashraf was dead and gave the police the location of the body. Nyfløt stated that in order to pay off his gambling debts, he had kidnapped Ashraf on orders from Khan, and that she had suffocated by accident while in the trunk. Khan denied ordering her murder and stated his intention was to have her kidnapped and tortured, not murdered. The motive for this was Ashraf's refusal to marry him. The two suspects had met while Nyfløt worked at a gas-station in Tveita where Khan was a regular customer.

Trial
Nyfløt and Khan was on Thursday 14 May 2011 convicted respectively on the counts of second-degree murder and kidnapping of Faiza Ashraf. Neither of the two was convicted of premeditated murder. They were sentenced to 8 and 17 years in prison, respectively. However, both sentences were personally ordered to be appealed by attorney general Tor-Aksel Busch who felt strongly that the court had made the wrong decision, and during the second trial, both men were convicted of premeditated murder and kidnapping and had their sentences increased to 19 years for Khan and 18 years for Nyfløt. In addition, both men were to pay NOK 200,000 in compensation to Ashraf's parents.

On 28 March 2012 the Supreme Court of Norway declined to review both cases, effectively ending the appeals process of both men.

See also
List of kidnappings
List of solved missing person cases

References

2010s in Oslo
2010s missing person cases
2010 murders in Norway
Crime in Oslo
Deaths by strangulation
February 2010 crimes
February 2010 events in Europe
Female murder victims
Formerly missing people
Kidnappings in Norway
Missing person cases in Norway
Trials in Norway
Bærum
Violence against women in Norway